Terry Cole is a British TV and film stuntman.

Career 
Cole has been part of the entertainment business for many years, performing for live audiences, TV and film. He has had many roles in various films and television shows. He is known for chopping apples and grapes in half on the back of a volunteer's neck with a samurai sword.

Cole spent his first years in show business training and travelling with a circus across Europe.  Subsequently, having created his own act, he began performing for live audiences across the UK and Europe. He has starred in many TV programmes and films as himself, as well as acting in other roles.

He has broken over 150 Guinness World Records and appeared in the 2007 Guinness World Records book with a picture of him balancing the most cigar boxes on his chin. He is also known for his performance on the Ripley's Believe It or Not the TV series, for hammering a 6-inch nail into a piece of wood with his bare hand and then pulling it out with his teeth. He was disqualified for the use of fake teeth.

Cole works for Thales in his spare time.

Personal life 
Cole was born and brought up in Walthamstow, London, and currently lives there as well.

Filmography 
 The Vanguard  (2008)
 I.D. (1995)

TV 
As himself

 Britain's Got Talent
 Record Breakers (4 times)
 Britains Wildest
 You Punt
 Big Breakfast (4 times)
 Don't Try This at Home
 London Tonight
 Newsround
 Record of the Year 2004
 News at Six
 Just Amazing
 Pebble Mill at One
 Six O Clock Show
 What's up Doc (twice)
 That's Life with Esther Rantzen
 Talking Telephone Numbers
 Ripley's Believe It or Not
 The Way It Is
 Central News
 You Asked For It (a US TV show)
 James Whale Show

Acting roles
 Bad Girls
 EastEnders
 The Bill
 London's Burning
 The Knock

External links 
 Terry Cole's Homesite
 

British stunt performers
English male film actors
English male television actors
People from Walthamstow
Year of birth missing (living people)
Living people